Pushed to the Limit is a 1992 action pro wrestling feature film written by Mimi Lesseos and directed by Michael Mileham. Starring Mimi Lesseos and Verrel Lester Reed, the film is about a wrestling queen who finds out that a gangster is responsible for her brother's death and trains in kickboxing to avenge his death.

Development
Prior to starting work on Pushed to the Limit, Mimi Lesseos was an experienced professional wrestler and she had experience working in make-up, acting and stunt work in a number of productions. She has stated that her interest in making a film of her own was in part a reaction to the exploitative roles which she had accepted in her earlier work, as she wished to portray a fit and strong female character who was not "sleazy or muscle-bound". Lessos wrote, starred in and produced the work. Half of the $600,000 budget was provided through an investor, while she provided the other half, selling property and, at one point, traveling to Japan to raise money through her professional fights. While in Japan she found a distributor, and worldwide distribution was gained after taking the movie to the Cannes Film Festival.

Cast
Mimi Lesseos as Mimi 
Henry Hayashi as Harry Lee 
Verrel Reed as Vern (as Verrel Lester Reed Jr.) 
Barbara Braverman as Mom 
Greg Ostrin as John Cordon 
Rick Shaw as Fred 
Frank Trejo as Frank 
Michael M. Foley as Nick  
Amy Barcroft as Sheeba 
Christl Colven as Inga 
Terrance Curtis as Tony 
Alex Demir as Mike 
Alfons Giodano as Fernel 
Lorraine Hawkins as Terri

Critical reception
Girls With Guns gave the film a poor review, writing "Lesseos makes for a decent fighter and a tolerable actress, though the subplot which has her as a showgirl in Vegas is irrelevant, inane and positively wince-inducing ... it's the story that really kills this ... having a female lead is a nice idea, but much more effort is needed, rather than thinking this is sufficient in and of itself. TV Guide also panned the film, offering "a film of the calibre of PUSHED TO THE LIMIT defies criticism by its multitude of mistakes, from Lesseos's self-aggrandizing screenplay to Michael Mileham's bungled direction—rendering it not good, not bad, but gleefully awful ... Thankfully, Michael Mileham's incompetent direction blunts any glorification of Lesseos. Mileham directs with his eyes closed--scenes are jumbled and the point of scenes obscured by characters who block the camera lens", and concludes with "as a truly bad film, you can't get any better--or worse--than this shoddy and cheapjack ego".

Despite the film itself having poor reviews, star Mimi Lesseos received recognition when the film was screened at the 2006 Action On Film International Film Festival 14 years after its initial release and she received nominations for both "Breakout Action Star" and "Female Action Performer of the Year".

References

External links 
 

1992 films
1990s action films
American martial arts films
Women's professional wrestling films
1992 martial arts films
1990s English-language films
1990s American films